Rajinder Singh (born 15 April 1960) is an Indian former cricketer. He played first-class cricket for Bengal and Delhi between 1980 and 1991.

See also
 List of Bengal cricketers
 List of Delhi cricketers

References

External links
 

1960 births
Living people
Indian cricketers
Bengal cricketers
Delhi cricketers
Cricketers from Delhi